The year 693 BC was a year of the pre-Julian Roman calendar. In the Roman Empire, it was known as year 61 Ab urbe condita . The denomination 693 BC for this year has been used since the early medieval period, when the Anno Domini calendar era became the prevalent method in Europe for naming years.

Events

By place

Middle East 
 Babylon is destroyed by the Assyrian king Sennacherib, but the city will be rebuilt in even greater splendor and luxury. He fights his way back north and captures various cities along the River Euphrates.

Births

Deaths
 Nergal-ushezib, king of Babylonia

References